The fifty U.S. states, the District of Columbia, the five inhabited U.S. territories, and the U.S. Minor Outlying Islands have taken their names from a wide variety of languages. The names of 24 states derive from indigenous languages of the Americas and one from Hawaiian. Of those that come from Native American languages, eight come from Algonquian languages, seven from Siouan languages (one of those via Miami-Illinois, which is an Algonquian language), three from Iroquoian languages, two from Muskogean languages, one from a Caddoan language, one from an Eskimo-Aleut language, one from a Uto-Aztecan language, and one from either an Athabaskan language or a Uto-Aztecan language.

Twenty other state names derive from European languages: seven come from Latin (mostly from Latinized forms of English personal names, one of those coming from Welsh), five from English, five from Spanish, and three from French (one of those via English). The source language/language family of the remaining five states is disputed or unclear: Arizona, Idaho, Maine, Oregon, and Rhode Island.

Of the fifty states, eleven are named after an individual person. Six of those are named in honor of European monarchs: the two Carolinas, the two Virginias, Georgia, and Louisiana. In addition, Maryland is named after Queen Henrietta Maria, queen consort of King Charles I of England, and New York after the then-Duke of York, who later became King James II of England. Over the years, several attempts have been made to name a state after one of the Founding Fathers or other great statesmen of U.S. history: the State of Franklin, the State of Jefferson (three separate attempts), the State of Lincoln (two separate attempts), and the State of Washington; in the end, only Washington materialized (Washington Territory was carved out of the Columbia District and renamed Washington in order to avoid confusion with the District of Columbia, which contains the city of Washington).

Several of the states that derive their names from (corrupted) names used for Native peoples have retained the plural ending in "s": Arkansas, Illinois, Kansas, Massachusetts, and Texas. One common naming pattern has been as follows:

State names
<onlyinclude>

Territory and federal district names

See also
 List of Canadian provincial and territorial name etymologies
 Lists of U.S. county name etymologies
 Toponymy

Notes

References

Bibliography
Bright, William (2004). Native American Placenames of the United States. Norman: University of Oklahoma Press.
Guyton, Kathy (2009). U.S. State Names: The Stories of How Our States Were Named Nederland, Colorado: Mountain Storm Press.

External links

United States
Etymologies
State Name
United States